William Gibb Robertson (13 November 1928 – 26 June 1973) was a Scottish professional footballer, who played in the English Football League for Chelsea and Leyton Orient. He was a goalkeeper, playing in 26 matches in the 1954–55 season, when Chelsea won the First Division championship.  In total he played 199 League games whilst at Chelsea and 215 in total for the club.

Robertson was born on 13 November 1928 in Glasgow, and died in Sutton, London on 26 June 1973, at the age of 44.

References

External links
Robertson's Chelsea stats and photo on Chelsea F.C. website

1928 births
1973 deaths
Scottish footballers
Association football goalkeepers
Chelsea F.C. players
Leyton Orient F.C. players
English Football League players